Tioga High School is a senior high school in Tioga, Texas and a part of the Tioga Independent School District.

History
It is currently unknown when Tioga High School originally opened but it is known to be closed in 1961. making Tioga ISD a Pre-Kindergarten through 8th grade district. Students in grades nine through twelve attended Gunter High School in the Gunter Independent School District.

However, beginning with the 2012–2013 school year, the District began its own high school, starting with the 9th grade and adding one grade each year until all 12 grades were served in the 2015–2016 school year. At one time the district considered consolidating with another school district. Instead it opted to re-establish its high school.

VLK Architects, a company in Fort Worth, Texas, is designing the building. In July 2016 the district voters approved a lease-purchase agreement to buy land for the high school. Groundbreaking occurred in December 2016.

References

External links
 Tioga High School

Public high schools in Texas
Schools in Grayson County, Texas